Chips from the Chocolate Fireball: An Anthology is a compilation album from XTC which was released under the pseudonym the Dukes of Stratosphear. It includes both their 1985 mini-album 25 O'Clock and the Psonic Psunspot album from 1987.

Track listing
All songs written by Sir John Johns, except where noted.

 "25 O'Clock" – 5:03
 "Bike Ride to the Moon" – 2:23
 "My Love Explodes" – 3:49
 "What in the World??..." – 5:01 (The Red Curtain)
 "Your Gold Dress" – 4:42
 "The Mole from the Ministry" – 5:58
 "Vanishing Girl" – 2:59 (Curtain)
 "Have You Seen Jackie?" – 3:21
 "Little Lighthouse" – 4:31
 "You're a Good Man Albert Brown (Curse You Red Barrel)" – 3:38
 "Collideascope" – 3:22
 "You're My Drug" – 3:19
 "Shiny Cage" – 3:17 (Curtain)
 "Brainiac's Daughter" – 3:59
 "The Affiliated" – 2:31 (Curtain)
 "Pale and Precious" – 4:58

Personnel 
The Dukes of Stratosphear
 Sir John Johns – vocals, guitar, bass on "What in the World??..." and "Vanishing Girl"
 The Red Curtain – vocals, bass, rhythm guitar on "What in the World??..."
 Lord Cornelius Plum – mellotron, piano, organ, fuzz-tone guitar
 E.I.E.I. Owen – drum set
 Lily Fraser – narration

Production
 Produced by John Leckie and The Dukes

References

External links
 gozcu

Albums produced by John Leckie
The Dukes of Stratosphear compilation albums
1986 compilation albums
Virgin Records compilation albums